The Chosen Eight are members of a fictional tribe of elves on the World of Two Moons in the comic book Elfquest, created by Wendy and Richard Pini.

The Chosen Eight, as their name implies, are the hunters specially selected to provide sustenance for the rest of their tribe, the Gliders. The Gliders are taller than most of the other tribes of elves on the World of Two Moons. They are magic users who choose to reside within Blue Mountain, a refuge they shaped to mimic the Palace of the High Ones. The High Ones were the first elves (actually a race of aliens) to arrive on the World of Two Moons during what's assumed to be this world's prehistoric period. (Elfquest, Fire and Flight, volume one)

Thousands of years before the time of the Elfquest story, In order to avoid murder by the native humans, who were threatened by these strange beings, some of the High Ones escaped into the hills and took up residence within Blue Mountain.  These elves became the Gliders, and they developed and maintained the use of their magical powers within the mountain's confines under the rigid control of Winnowill, their manipulative leader.

Characteristics 
The Gliders, like the other tribes of elves, possess the power to communicate telepathically, called sending. They can also levitate themselves and use this power to lift objects and propel themselves in flight.

The Chosen Eight wear uniforms modeled after the plumage of birds. They ally themselves with giant hawklike birds, which they ride while hunting for prey. Weapons they typically use include small knives and spears, as well as a clawlike grasping implement. While they have a close bond with their birds, the Chosen Eight do not seem to have the kind of spiritual link with these birds that the Wolfriders have with their mounts.

The Chosen Eight, like the rest of the Gliders, are pure-blooded elves. Their blood is not mingled with that of wolves like the Wolfriders. This makes the Chosen Eight immortal.

The High Ones are also referred to as the Firstcomers. Winnowill initially claimed that the Gliders were the High Ones; this was a deception on her part, as Lord Voll later disclosed that his parents remembered fleeing the palace, and that he remembered seeing it as a boy. Winnowill and Voll are actually "second generation" elves, children of the High Ones. (Captives of Blue Mountain; reprints Elfquest issues 6–10)

History 
The Wolfriders first encounter the Chosen Eight (prior to the introduction of the rest of the Gliders or Blue Mountain) in the story arc/graphic novel The Forbidden Grove. Strongbow, a Wolfrider, shoots down a large bird making its fledgling flight, despite warnings not to from Suntop, son of Cutter the wolf chief, a young boy elf who senses magic. This bird turns out to have been the “bond-bird” of Kureel, one of the Chosen Eight, later revealed in Captives at Blue Mountain.

The Chosen Eight then take most of the fleeing Wolfriders captive; Suntop is among those who escape. The Wolfriders are then forced into indentured servitude to the Gliders as penance for slaying the bond-bird. Strongbow is  trapped in a thorny cage of shaped rock and tortured mercilessly by Winnowill, the leader of the Gliders.

Cutter, the Wolfriders' chief, attempts to rescue his captive tribe members with help from his lifemate, Leetah, and his best friend, Skywise. They make it into the mountain's walls and are astonished to discover these strange new elves.  Suntop's "magic feeling" alerts him to the fact that Winnowill is the "evil presence" that his mentor, Savah, warned him about when the Wolfriders left the village of Sorrow's End.

During the resulting skirmish within the mountain, Winnowill dissuades the Wolfriders from fighting as she announces (falsely) that "We are the High Ones!" The Wolfriders are divided in their reactions to this news. Strongbow, still traumatized by his torture at Winnowill's hand, chooses to refuse Lord Voll's offer of hospitality within Blue Mountain and leaves the mountain with his lifemate, Moonshade, to wait in the forests below for the rest of the Wolfriders.

During the Captives of Blue Mountain story arc, Leetah discovers from Winnowill that her healing gifts are actually a form of flesh-shaping, not unlike rock-shaping or tree shaping, powers demonstrated by a few elves at various times in elfin history.

Skywise and the Glider Aroree become better acquainted as Skywise rides with Aroree on her giant bond-bird, the first time he had ever flown. While they make their flight, Aroree soars over a camp of humans and tosses them some new spears. The Wolfriders come to realize that the Gliders, in their arrogance, had convinced the humans that they were gods.

The Gliders and the Wolfriders form an uneasy alliance for a while, until Winnowill attempts to kidnap Suntop and orders the Chosen Eight to attack the Wolfriders again. Her motive is to force them out of Blue Mountain before Lord Voll could become inspired by them to lead the Gliders from Blue Mountain to the High Ones' Palace. Leetah eventually defeats Winnowill when Winnowill is injured by Strongbow's arrow; Leetah heals her injury, only to have Winnowill slip from her grasp and step off a ledge, seemingly to her death. Lord Voll orders the Chosen Eight to transport the Wolfriders over the snow-capped mountains to the High Ones' Palace, but his bond-bird is shot down by a troll spear; Voll and his mount are both killed.

The Chosen Eight recoil, reviling the Wolfriders and ending their association with them in the wake of their leader's death. They abandon the Wolfriders to the trolls' attack, under the command of King Guttlekraw (Elfquest: Quest's End, Vol. 4).

The Chosen Eight and the Wolfriders do not meet again until after the Wolfriders and the Go-Backs, a snow-dwelling tribe of elves living in the Frozen Mountains far to the north of Blue Mountain, discover the lost Palace. Aroree of the Chosen Eight flees into the Forbidden Grove, where the Wolfriders had built their new holt (their home). Winnowill had sent her on a search for Preservers, the winged, web-spinning sprites that the High Ones used to preserve their bodies during their original journey to the World of Two Moons. Skywise confronts Aroree, accosting her when she comes to the area of the holt. However, Aroree, in thrall to the evil Winnowill, sees in Dewshine's cub (son) Windkin, fathered by Tyldak of the Gliders, a way to escape from Blue Mountain and Winnowill's clutches. She kidnaps Windkin and offers him to Winnowill in her place in order to leave the Chosen Eight. (Siege at Blue Mountain)

Kureel of the Eight seeks to sway Aroree back into the Gliders' fold, attempting to stop her from leaving. Aroree stabs him during the resulting confrontation.

The Wolfriders outwit the Chosen Eight when they send two of their human friends into Blue Mountain, posing as Winnowill's worshippers and offering themselves as servants to the Chosen Eight. The Eight are distracted with wine and then trapped in preserver cocoons while Cutter and Skywise rescue Dewshine and baby Windkin. They also free Tyldak, the winged elf, who had been bound and tortured in chains by Winnowill.

The Gliders (except for a handful) and all of the Chosen Eight but Aroree are killed when Blue Mountain collapses under the weight of a multilayered structure known as the Egg.

The deceased Gliders, including the seven deceased members of the Chosen Eight, find a temporary home within Rayek, the powerful Sun Folk magic user, who bonds with them telepathically. Their souls are drawn into him, vastly increasing his own powers. (Siege at Blue Mountain, Secret of Two-Edge) The presence of the souls of the Gliders within his psyche drives Rayek mad with power, and in a rage, he destroys the home of another tribe of elves, the Go-Backs.

Aroree, the only surviving member of the Chosen Eight and now all but alone in the world, is forgiven by the Wolfriders for the kidnapping of Windkin, and later becomes a member of the Wolfrider tribe.

Original members of the Chosen Eight 
Kureel – male, deceased; killed by Strongbow—the first time anyone can remember that an elf kills another elf.
Aroree - female, alive. Aroree bargains for her freedom from Winnowill's control by kidnapping Dewshine's cub, Windkin, fathered by Tyldak (see Siege at Blue Mountain, volume 5)
Reevol (male, deceased) - Reevol delivers Dewshine astride his bond-bird from Blue Mountain when the Wolfriders want to exchange Preservers for her and Windkin. He later perishes with the rest of the Gliders during the destruction of Blue Mountain (Secret of Two-Edge, volume 6)
Eresir - male, deceased; perishes during the destruction of Blue Mountain (Secret of Two-Edge, volume 6)
Talno - male, deceased; perishes during the destruction of Blue Mountain (Secret of Two-Edge, volume 6)
Oroleed - male, deceased; perishes during the destruction of Blue Mountain (Secret of Two-Edge, volume 6)
Hoykar - male, deceased; perishes during the destruction of Blue Mountain (Secret of Two-Edge, volume 6)
Yeyeen (female, deceased); perishes during the destruction of Blue Mountain (Secret of Two-Edge, volume 6)

External links
 Elfquest Bios homepage, Gliders

Fantasy comics
WaRP Graphics titles
Elfquest